Arthur Scott Walters is an American neurologist, a professor of neurology at the Vanderbilt University School of Medicine in Nashville, Tennessee, USA.

Research
Walters' research interests have focused on the nexus where sleep disorders and movement disorders meet. He is co-editor of the first book on sleep-related movement disorders in 2003 and is author on over 200 research publications.

Professional activities
Walters was the first chairman of the Medical Advisory Board of the Restless Legs Syndrome Foundation, a nationwide patient support group for patients with restless legs syndrome and their families and he continues to play a role on the board.  He was also first chairman of the executive committee and continuing activist in the International Restless Legs Syndrome Study Group, which is composed of over 130 physicians and scientists dedicated to research on restless legs syndrome and the allied condition periodic limb movements in sleep. He headed the American Academy of Sleep Medicine committee for the development of clinical criteria for the diagnosis of sleep related movement disorders International Classification of Sleep Disorders published in 2005 and their committee for the development of the sleep study scoring criteria for the sleep related movement disorders published in 2007. He moved to Vanderbilt University and was given a distinguished faculty medical license from the state of Tennessee in 2008.

Awards and honors
In 1998, Walters was the first recipient of the Restless Legs Syndrome Foundation's Ekbom Award. In 2005 he was named “Researcher of the Year in Medicine” at Seton Hall University. In 2010 he was given the American Academy of Neurology Sleep Science Award for excellence in sleep research.

Edited volumes - books
 Walters AS, ed Sleep Thief: The Restless Legs Syndrome. Orange Park, Fla. Galaxy Books, Inc., pp. 1–316, 1996
 Chokroverty S, Hening W, Walters, A eds., Sleep & Movement Disorders, 1st Edition, USA, Butterworth Heinemann, pp. 1–546, 2003. 2nd edition being revised for publication in 2012 by Oxford University Press.

Selected publications
 Arbuckle R, Abetz L, Dumer JS, Ivanenko A, Owens JA, Croenlein J, Bolton K, Moore A, Allen RP, Walters AS, Picchietti DL. Development of the Pediatric Restless Legs Syndrome Severity Scale (P-RSL-SS): A patient reported outcome measure of pediatric RLS symptoms and impact. Sleep Medicine 11:897-906; 2010
 Gao X, Lyall K, Palacios N, Walters AS, Ascherio A. RLS in middle age women and attention deficit/hyperactivity disorder in their offspring. Sleep Medicine 12:89-91; 2011
 England SJ, Picchietti DL, Couvadeli BV, Fisher BC, Siddiqui F, Wagner ML, Hening WA, Lewin D, Winnie G, Cohen B, Walters AS, L-Dopa Improves Restless Legs Syndrome and Periodic Limb Movements in Sleep but not Attention Deficit Hyperactivity Disorder in a Double-blind Trial in Children. Sleep Medicine 12:471-477; 2011
 Sun YMJ, Hoang T, Neubauer JA, Walters AS. Opioids protect against Substantia Nigra under conditions of iron deprivation: A mechanism of possible relevance to the Restless Legs Syndrome (RLS) and Parkinson's Disease. Journal of the Neurological Sciences 304:93-101; 2011.
 Weinstock LB and Walters AS. Restless Legs Syndrome is associated with Irritable Bowel Syndrome and small intestinal bacterial overgrowth. Sleep Medicine 12: 610-613; 2011.
 Lee DO, Ziman RB, Perkins AT, Poceta JS, Walters AS, Barrett RW, and the XP053 Study Group. A randomized, Double-Blind, Placebo-Controlled Study to Access the Effacacy and Tolerability of Gabapentin Encarbil in Subjects with Restless Legs Syndrome. Journal of Clinical Sleep medicine 7: 282-292; 2011
 Picchietti DL, Arbuckle R, Abetz L, Dumer JS, Ivanenko A, Owens JA, Croenlein J, Allen RP, Walters AS,. Pediatric Restless Legs Syndrome: analysis od system descriptions and drawings. J Child Neurology 26: 1365-76; 2011.
Mason, T.B.A., Arens R, Sharman J, Bintliff-Janisak B, Schultz B, Walters AS, Cater JR, Kaplan P, Pack AI. Sleep in Children with Williams Syndrome. Sleep Medicine 12: 892-7; 2011.
 Weinstock LB, Walters AS, Paueksakon P. Restless legs Syndrome - Theoretical roles of inflammatory and immune mechanisms: A review of the literature. Sleep Medicine Reviews 2012 (in Press).
 Yeh P, Walters AS, Tsuang JW, Restless Legs Syndrome: A comprehensive overview on its epidemiology, risk factors and treatment. Sleep and Breathing 2012 (In Press). 
 Yan X, Wang W-D, Walters AS, Wang Q, Liu Y-J, Chu F-Y. Traditional Chinese medicine herbal preparations in Restless Legs Syndrome (RLS) Treatment: A Review and probable first description of RLS in 1529. Sleep Medicine Reviews 2012 (in Press).

References

1943 births
Living people
Seton Hall University faculty
Vanderbilt University faculty